There are two species of skink named Boulenger's tree skink:
 Dasia subcaerulea
 Brachyseps frontoparietalis